Simone Sbardella (born 17 April 1993) is an Italian footballer who plays as a defender for Ostiamare calcio in Serie D.

Career

Como
In June 2019, Sbardella signed a two-year contract extension with the club.

Serie D
On 21 January 2021, he returned to Trastevere.

References

External links

1993 births
Living people
Alma Juventus Fano 1906 players
Matera Calcio players
S.C. Vallée d'Aoste players
Como 1907 players
Serie C players
Serie D players
Italian footballers
Association football defenders
Footballers from Rome